is a 1961 Japanese mystery film directed by Yoshitaro Nomura and is based on a novel by Seicho Matsumoto.

Plot
One week into newlywed Teiko Uhara's marriage, her husband, ad agency manager Kenichi, leaves on a short business trip to Kanazawa and doesn't return. With a pair of old photographs she found among his belongings, Teiko travels across Japan to search for him, first with the help of her husband's employer, later on her own. After a series of mysterious deaths, including a reception girl of the agency's Kanazawa branch, who turns out to be Kenichi's common law wife, and Kenichi's alleged suicide, all clues lead to Sachiko Murota, wife of a wealthy business partner of her husband. Teiko confronts Mrs. Murota and blames her for murdering Kenichi and everyone who knew of her past as a prostitute in the post-war era. Yet, as Mrs. Murota's confession reveals, the truth is even more complex than that.

Cast
 Yoshiko Kuga as Teiko Uhara
 Hizuru Takachiho as Sachiko Murota / Emmy
 Ineko Arima as Hisako Tanuma
 Koji Nambara as Kenichi Uhara
 Kō Nishimura as Sotaro Uhara
 Yoshi Katō as Mr. Murota
 Sadako Sawamura as Sotaro's wife
 Takanobu Hozumi as Mr. Honda

Awards
1961 Blue Ribbon Award for Best Supporting Actress (Hizuru Takachiho)

Legacy
Seicho Matsumoto's novel was again adapted in 2009 by Isshin Inudō with Ryōko Hirosue as Teiko Uhara.

References

External links
 
 
 
 

1961 films
Japanese black-and-white films
1960s Japanese-language films
1960s mystery films
Films based on Japanese novels
Films directed by Yoshitaro Nomura
Japanese mystery films
Films scored by Yasushi Akutagawa
Films set in Ishikawa Prefecture
1960s Japanese films